Ralph Chapman was an American football player.

Ralph Chapman may also refer to:

 Ralph Chapman (footballer) (1906–1999), UK
 Ralph Chapman (paleontologist)
 Ralph Chapman (politician) (born 1951), USA